Oppurg is a Verwaltungsgemeinschaft ("collective municipality") in the district Saale-Orla-Kreis, in Thuringia, Germany. The seat of the Verwaltungsgemeinschaft is in Oppurg.

The Verwaltungsgemeinschaft Oppurg consists of the following municipalities:

References

Verwaltungsgemeinschaften in Thuringia